Gopi Krishna (30 May 1903 – 31 July 1984) was a yogi, mystic, teacher, social reformer and writer. He was born in a small village outside Srinagar, in the Indian state of Jammu and Kashmir. He spent his early years there, and later lived in Lahore, in the Punjab of British India. He was one of the first to popularise the concept of Kundalini among Western readers. His autobiography Kundalini: The Evolutionary Energy in Man, which presented his personal account of the phenomenon of his awakening of Kundalini, (later renamed Living with Kundalini), was published in Great Britain and the United States and has since appeared in eleven major languages. According to June McDaniel, his writings have influenced Western interest in kundalini yoga.

Career 
At the age of twenty, he returned to Kashmir. During the succeeding years he secured a post in the state government, married and raised a family. Early in his career he became the leader of a social organisation that was devoted to helping the disadvantaged in his community, especially with regard to issues concerning the well-being and rights of women.
His autobiography, Kundalini: The Evolutionary Energy in Man.  

At the age of thirty-four, while meditating one morning, he reported to have experienced the sudden and forceful awakening of Kundalini.
"The illumination grew brighter and brighter, the roaring louder, I experienced a rocking sensation and then felt myself slipping out of my body, entirely enveloped in a halo of light...I felt the point of consciousness that was myself growing wider, surrounded by waves of light...I was now all consciousness, without any outline, without any idea of a corporeal appendage, without any feeling or sensation coming from the senses, immersed in a sea of light simultaneously conscious and aware of every point, spread out, as it were, in all directions without any barrier or material obstruction...bathed in light and in a state of exaltation and happiness impossible to describe."

Gopi Krishna's experience radically altered the path of his life. He came to believe that the human brain was evolving and that an individual's profound mystical experience was a foretaste of what would eventually become an all-pervasive transformation in human consciousness. By his own account, Gopi Krishna's initial experience triggered a transformative process that lasted for twelve years. During this time, the sensations of light, splendor and joy alternated with – and were often completely overshadowed by – sensations of fire, unbearable heat and bleak depression.  In the introduction to Krishna's book, Frederic Spiegelberg writes:

Before his death in 1984 at the age of eighty-one, Gopi Krishna would write seventeen books on Higher Consciousness – three of them entirely in verse. He credited this output not to his own efforts but to inspiration from a higher source.

One of the lesser-known facts about Gopi Krishna's life is that he was a crusader for women's rights. Putting this in historical and cultural context shows how very extraordinary his dedication to this cause was. In 1930 it had been less than ten years since women had won the vote and the vast majority of the women in the world were still considered chattel. In India conditions for women were even worse and a man campaigning publicly for women's rights would have been unheard of.

Gopi Krishna was reported to be a supporter for the equality of men and women. He acted, and at one point ended up imprisoned for his actions. One of his most far-reaching contributions involved bettering conditions for widows. At that time in India, the plight of a woman whose husband died was often horrific, especially if she had no grown children to help or protect her. The custom of sati (throwing oneself on the husband's funeral pyre) though outlawed was still practised, particularly in remote areas.

Along with his humanitarian efforts, Gopi Krishna produced poetry and books in prose and verse form. But his main thrust over the years was to write about mystical experience and the evolution of consciousness from a scientific point of view – that there is supposed to be a biological mechanism in the human body, known from ancient times in India as Kundalini, which is responsible for creativity, genius, psychic ability, religious,  and mystical experience, etc.

Additional Information 

He chose the path of yoga due to his circumstances. His father renounced the world to lead a religious life leaving his twenty-eight-year-old mother with the responsibility of raising him and his two sisters. His mother now pinned all her hopes for success on her only son. Pandit Gopi Krishna was also a good freestyle wrestler and it is well known that he beat many a good wrestler. People who knew him well mention that he had the capability to be a world class wrestler, however, he spent most of his energy on intellectual pursuits.

But he failed to pass the examination to enter college, and he now took a lowly job and established his family. He also started on a discipline of meditation to discover who he was. After having been engaged in this for many years, he had his first Kundalini experience at the age of 34, which he describes thus in his autobiography:

Suddenly, with a roar like that of a waterfall, I felt a stream of liquid light entering my brain through the spinal cord.

Entirely unprepared for such a development, I was completely taken by surprise; but regaining my self-control, keeping my mind on the point of concentration. The illumination grew brighter and brighter, the roaring louder, I experienced a rocking sensation and then felt myself slipping out of my body, entirely enveloped in a halo of light. It is impossible to describe the experience accurately. I felt the point of consciousness that was myself growing wider surrounded by waves of light. It grew wider and wider, spreading outward while the body, normally the immediate object of its perception, appeared to have receded into the distance until I became entirely unconscious of it. I was now all consciousness without any outline, without any idea of corporeal appendage, without any feeling or sensation coming from the senses, immersed in a sea of light simultaneously conscious and aware at every point, spread out, as it were, in all directions without any barrier or material obstruction. I was no longer myself, or to be more accurate, no longer as I knew myself to be, a small point of awareness confined to a body, but instead was a vast circle of consciousness in which the body was but a point, bathed in light and in a state of exultation and happiness impossible to describe.

According to June McDaniel, his writings have influenced Western interest in kundalini yoga.  He wrote many books and travelled all over the world giving lectures. He came to feel the kundalini experience underlies all (or most) religions that started with a personal revelation. He could see kundalini iconography in cultures worldwide, from ancient Egypt to Quetzalcoatl to the caduceus of Mercury, and believed there was a common basis, and that he had been granted entry to this vision. Gopi Krishna theorised that the brain was in a state of organic evolution, and that the rising of Kundalini into the brain would open a normally silent chamber called brahma-randra in the yogic tradition. Krishna worked tirelessly to promote the scientific investigation of kundalini in the human frame, hypothesizing that this energy was leading humankind towards the goal of Higher Consciousness.

Research of genius and enlightened persons 

In the light of Pandit Gopi Krishna's experiences he himself has started to search the life of geniuses and enlightened persons in history for clues of kundalini awakening. He proposed an organisation to be erected to conduct scientific research on the matter.
The research should, according to him, consist of research on biological processes in the body, psychological and sociological research of living persons.
According to Mr. Krishna the lives of historical persons should also be investigated.

See also 
 Consciousness
 Enlightenment (spiritual)
 Kundalini
 Kundalini: The Evolutionary Energy in Man
 Prakasa
 Prana
 Qi
 Shakti

Bibliography 
Gopi Krishna 
 Yoga: A Vision of its Future, New Delhi: KRPT, 1978.
 Secrets of Kundalini in Panchastivai New Delhi: KRPT, 1976
 The Awakening of Kundalini, New York: E P Dutton, 1975.
 The Real Nature of Mystical Experience, New York: New Concepts Publishing, 1978.
 The Shape of Events to Come,  New York: KRPT, 1979. A warning of possible impending nuclear holocaust, in essay and verse.
 The Riddle of Consciousness, New York: Kundalini Research Foundation, 1976. , entirely in verse.
 The Secret of Yoga, New York: Harper and Row, 1972.
 Higher Consciousness: The Evolutionary Thrust of Kundalini, New York: Julian Press, 1974.
Gopi Krishna, with another author
 Kundalini: The Evolutionary Energy in Man, Shambhala Books, 1970 (autobiography); commentaries by James Hillman, totaling 40 pages.
 The Biological Basis of Religion and Genius, New York: Harper and Row, 1971, 1972; introduction by Carl Friedrich Freiherr von Weizsäcker, which is half the book.
other authors
 William Irwin Thompson, Passages about Earth: An Exploration of the New Planetary Culture, New York: Harper and Row, 1974. one chapter describes his interaction with Gopi Krishna

Notes

References

External links 

 A collection of links related to Gopi Krishna
 General info on Gopi Krishna en Kundalini

Indian spiritual writers
1903 births
1984 deaths
Indian Hindu yogis
Kashmiri people
Indian autobiographers
People from Srinagar district
Indian social reformers
20th-century Indian non-fiction writers
Writers from Jammu and Kashmir
Activists from Jammu and Kashmir